Martta Helena Salmela-Järvinen (born Hellstedt, 31 March 1892, Kylmäkoski - 16 September 1987) was a Finnish politician and writer. At first she was a member of the Social Democratic Party of Finland and, after 1959, of the Social Democratic Union of Workers and Smallholders. She served as a Member of Parliament from 1 September 1939 to 4 April 1966.

References 

1892 births
1987 deaths
People from Akaa
People from Häme Province (Grand Duchy of Finland)
Social Democratic Party of Finland politicians
Social Democratic Union of Workers and Smallholders politicians
Members of the Parliament of Finland (1939–45)
Members of the Parliament of Finland (1945–48)
Members of the Parliament of Finland (1948–51)
Members of the Parliament of Finland (1951–54)
Members of the Parliament of Finland (1954–58)
Members of the Parliament of Finland (1958–62)
Members of the Parliament of Finland (1962–66)
Finnish people of World War II
20th-century Finnish women politicians
Women members of the Parliament of Finland